= The Demon Inside =

- Directed by: Joey Moran
- Written by: Joey Moran
- Produced by: Timothy Talbott
- Starring: Joseph Rene; Madeline Thelton; Timothy Talbott; Chloe Lee
- Cinematography: Carlos Baker
- Edited by: Daniel Armstrong
- Production company: Skeleton Kreek Films
- Distributed by: Dauntless Studio
- Release date: 16 May 2017
- Running time: 95 minutes
- Country: United States
- Language: English

Il demone interiore is a 2017 American horror thriller film, starring Joseph Rene, Madeline Thelton, Timothy Talbott and Chloe Lee.

== Cast ==
- Joseph Rene as Sam Parsons
- Madeline Thelton as Courtney Parsons
- Timothy Talbott as Corbin Carlyle
- Chloe Lee as Harper Parsons
- Jake Ryan Hull as Tips
- Crew Wyard as Lance
- Crystal Cook as Linda
- John Kviklys as Ray
- Grace Patterson as Brianna
- Jason Nicholson as Teddy
- Jack Watkins as Mr. Gaines
- Lance Eakright as Security Guy

== Reception ==
Mac Brewer of Horror Society gave the film a score of 3/5 and called the performances "inconsistent", the plot "straight forward and simple" and the effects "absolutely phenomenal". Matt Boiselle of Dread Central rated the film 3 stars out of 5 and stated that Moran "uses both fair amounts of subtle humor and horror to effectively transport his work of a family’s home under siege from malevolent spirits". Boiselle opined that the acting is "well-performed" and a "nice measure to help compliment the story in its progression." James Evans of Starburst wrote: "It may well be random with a supremely silly ending but we kinda liked it and as a little bit of an offbeat calling card for Moran it shows promise."
